Joaquín Canales Escobar (born May 19, 1962) is a Salvadoran former footballer.

Club career
With the exception of a short spell in the United States with the Washington Diplomats, Canales has played all of his professional career with his hometown club, Alianza FC.

International career
Cárcamo made his debut for El Salvador in 1988 and earned a total of five caps in 13 years, scoring no goals. He played at the 1991 UNCAF Nations Cup.

External links
 edhdeportes.com - EDH Deportes 
 

1962 births
Living people
Association football midfielders
Salvadoran footballers
El Salvador international footballers